The 1980–81 Iraq FA Cup was the fifth edition of the Iraq FA Cup as a clubs-only competition. The tournament was won by Al-Zawraa for the third time, beating 1980–81 Iraqi National League champions Al-Talaba 1–0 in the final with a goal from Thamir Yousef. Al-Zawraa's previous results in the tournament included a 3–0 win over Al-Najaf, a 2–0 win over Al-Amana and a 1–0 win over Al-Shabab. Al-Talaba's previous results were a 6–5 penalty shootout win over Al-Shorta, a 2–0 win over Al-Ittihad and a 1–0 win over Al-Minaa.

Matches

Final

References

External links
 Iraqi Football Website

Iraq FA Cup
Cup